A shadow person (also known as a shadow figure or black mass) is the perception of a patch of shadow as a living, humanoid figure, and interpreted as the presence of a spirit or other entity by believers in the paranormal or supernatural.

History and folklore
A number of religions, legends, and belief systems describe supernatural entities such as shades of the underworld, and various shadowy creatures have long been a staple of folklore and ghost stories, such as the Islamic Jinn and the Choctaw Nalusa Chito.

The Coast to Coast AM late night radio talk show helped popularize modern beliefs in shadow people. The first time the topic of shadow people was discussed at length on the show was April 12, 2001, when host Art Bell interviewed a man purporting to be a Native American elder, Thunder Strikes, who is also known as Harley "SwiftDeer" Reagan. During the show, listeners were encouraged to submit drawings of shadow people that they had seen and a large number of these drawings were immediately shared publicly on the website.

In October that year, Heidi Hollis published her first book on the topic of shadow people, and later became a regular guest on Coast to Coast. Hollis describes shadow people as dark silhouettes with human shapes and profiles that flicker in and out of peripheral vision, and claims that people have reported the figures attempting to "jump on their chest and choke them". She believes the figures to be negative aliens that can be repelled by various means, including invoking "the Name of Jesus".

Although participants in online discussion forums devoted to paranormal and supernatural topics describe them as menacing, other believers and paranormal authors do not agree whether shadow people are either evil, helpful, or neutral, and some even speculate that shadow people may be the extra-dimensional inhabitants of another universe. Some paranormal investigators and authors such as Chad Stambaugh claim to have recorded images of shadow people on video.

Shadow people feature in two episodes of ITV paranormal documentary series Extreme Ghost Stories, where the phenomenon is described as a "black mass".

A figure who is often associated with shadow people is the hat man - a famous urban legend who shares many characteristics with the afformentioned entities but wears dark clothing (often a jacket), an old-style fedora hat and is unusually tall (the latter depending on "sightings"). Sometimes, the figure is stated to be the devil himself.

Scientific explanations
Several physiological and psychological conditions can account for reported experiences of shadowy shapes seeming alive. A sleep paralysis sufferer may perceive a "shadowy or indistinct shape" approaching them when they lie awake paralyzed and become increasingly alarmed.

A person experiencing heightened emotion, such as while walking alone on a dark night, may incorrectly perceive a patch of shadow as an attacker.

Many methamphetamine addicts report the appearance of "shadow people" after prolonged periods of sleep deprivation. Psychiatrist Jack Potts suggests that methamphetamine usage adds a "conspiratorial component" to the sleep deprivation hallucinations. One interviewed subject said that "You don't see shadow dogs or shadow birds or shadow cars. You see shadow people. Standing in doorways, walking behind you, coming at you on the sidewalk." These hallucinations have been directly compared to the paranormal entities described in folklore.

Shadow people are commonly reported by people under the effects of deliriant substances such as datura, diphenhydramine, and benzydamine.

Finally, visual hallucinations, such as those caused by schizophrenia and bipolar disorder, may appear to be shadowy figures at the edge of peripheral vision.

In popular culture
The Nightmare is a 2015 documentary that discusses the causes of sleep paralysis as seen through extensive interviews with participants, and the experiences are re-enacted by professional actors. It proposes that such cultural phenomena as alien abduction, the near death experience and shadow people can, in many cases, be attributed to sleep paralysis. The "real-life" horror film debuted at the Sundance Film Festival on January 26 and premiered in theatres on June 5.
 Shadow people, described as "Shadow Men", feature prominently in the 2007 novel John Dies at the End. When they kill a person, that person is retroactively erased from existence, and history is rewritten as though they were never born.
 The 2013 horror film Shadow People depicts a fictional sleep study conducted during the 1970s in which patients report seeing shadowy intruders before dying in their sleep. The film follows a radio host and CDC investigator who research the story, and the story is claimed to be based on true events.
 In a 2012 episode of A&E's Intervention series, the subject Skyler is plagued by "shadow people", sometimes called "phase people", and sprays a mist to unveil them in the refractions. He also builds weapons to fight them and alleges that they are using stolen technology to telepathically communicate with certain individuals.
 In the online game Deep Sleep and its sequels, shadow people have existed since the dawn of the human race and lurk in lucid dreams. Players who realize that they are asleep can be paralyzed and possessed, and the character's dream self will be turned into a shadow person.
 An episode of the 1985 Twilight Zone series titled "The Shadow Man" dealt with a teenage boy who had a shadow person living under his bed. The episode portrayed the shadow man as fitting the "hat man" appearance commonly ascribed to shadow people and added to the mythology that shadow people can kill humans but will not harm those under whose beds they live.

See also
 Apparitional experience
 Brocken spectre
 Jinn
 Night terror
 Pareidolia
 Domovoy
 Men in black

References

Paranormal terminology
Ghosts
Jinn
Deities and spirits
Supernatural
Supernatural legends
Symptoms and signs of mental disorders
Urban legends
Apparitions
Hallucinations
Shadows